Oleksandr Oleksandrovych Azatskyi (born 13 January 1994) is a Ukrainian professional footballer who plays as a defender for Arka Gdynia.

Career
Azatskyi is the product of the Metalist Kharkiv Youth School System. He made his debut for FC Metalist in a match against FC Vorskla Poltava on 10 May 2012 in Ukrainian Premier League.

Honours
Dinamo Batumi
 Erovnuli Liga: 2021
 Georgian Super Cup: 2022

Torpedo Kutaisi
 Georgian Cup: 2018
 Georgian Super Cup: 2019

References

External links
 
 

1994 births
Living people
Footballers from Kharkiv
Ukrainian footballers
Association football defenders
Ukraine youth international footballers
Ukraine under-21 international footballers
FC Metalist Kharkiv players
FC Dynamo-2 Kyiv players
FC Dynamo Kyiv players
FC Chornomorets Odesa players
FC Baník Ostrava players
FC Torpedo Kutaisi players
FC Fastav Zlín players
FC Dinamo Batumi players
Arka Gdynia players
Ukrainian Premier League players
Ukrainian First League players
Czech First League players
Erovnuli Liga players

Ukrainian expatriate footballers
Expatriate footballers in the Czech Republic
Expatriate footballers in Georgia (country)
Expatriate footballers in Poland
Ukrainian expatriate sportspeople in the Czech Republic
Ukrainian expatriate sportspeople in Georgia (country)
Ukrainian expatriate sportspeople in Poland